Courtnall Douglas Skosan (born 24 July 1991) is a South African rugby player for Northampton Saints.

Club career

He remained at the  until the end of the 2013 season, making just twelve appearances.

In August 2021, he signed a contract with Premiership club Northampton Saints.

International career
In 2016, Skosan was included in a South Africa 'A' squad that played a two-match series against a touring England Saxons team. He was named in the starting line-up for their first match in Bloemfontein, but ended on the losing side as the visitors ran out 32–24 winners. He also started the second match of the series, a 26–29 defeat to the Saxons in George.

In 2017, Skosan was named to the South Africa team contesting a 3-match series against France. He started the first game and was awarded a penalty try after a French player held him back illegally at the goal line. He scored his first try in a test match on 19 August 2017 in the Rugby Championship test match between South Africa and Argentina.

References

External links
Courtnall Skosan at itsrugby.co.uk

South African rugby union players
Living people
1991 births
Blue Bulls players
Golden Lions players
Lions (United Rugby Championship) players
Rugby union wings
Rugby union players from Cape Town
South Africa Under-20 international rugby union players
South Africa international rugby union players
Northampton Saints players